Interdental consonants are produced by placing the tip of the tongue between the upper and lower front teeth. That differs from dental consonants, which are articulated with the tongue against the back of the upper incisors. No language is known to contrast interdental and dental consonants.

Interdental consonants are rare cross-linguistically. Interdental realisations of otherwise-dental or alveolar consonants may occur as idiosyncrasies or as coarticulatory effects of a neighbouring interdental sound. The most commonly-occurring interdental consonants are the non-sibilant fricatives (sibilants may be dental but do not appear as interdentals). Apparently, interdentals do not contrast with dental consonants in any language.

Voiced and voiceless interdental fricatives  appear in American English as the initial sounds of words like 'then' and 'thin'. In British English, the consonants are more likely to be dental .

An interdental  occurs in some varieties of Italian, and it may also occur in some varieties of English though the distribution and the usage of interdental  in English are not clear.

s  are found in about a dozen Philippine languages, including Kagayanen (Manobo branch), Karaga Mandaya (Mansakan branch), Kalagan (Mansakan branch), Southern Catanduanes Bicolano, and several varieties of Kalinga,
as well as in the Bauchi languages of Nigeria.

Interdental  occurs in some dialects of Amis.

In most Indigenous Australian languages, there is a series of "dental" consonants, written th, nh, and (in some languages) lh. They are always laminal (pronounced by touching with the blade of the tongue) but may be formed in one of three different ways, depending on the language, the speaker, and how carefully the speaker pronounces the sound. They are apical interdental  with the tip of the tongue visible between the teeth, as in th in American English; laminal interdental  with the tip of the tongue down behind the lower teeth, so that the blade is visible between the teeth; and denti-alveolar , that is, with both the tip and the blade making contact with the back of the upper teeth and alveolar ridge, as in French t, d, n, l.

See also

Bidental consonant

References

Phonetics
Coronal consonants